Mohammad Reza Mamani (born June 9, 1982) is a former Iranian footballer who played for Persepolis, Pas Hamedan, Shahrdari Yasuj and Rah Ahan during his football career.

Honours
Iran's Premier Football League Winner: 1
2007/08 with Persepolis

External links
Persian League Profile

1982 births
Living people
Iranian footballers
Association football midfielders
Persepolis F.C. players
Rah Ahan players